Eunotia is a genus of diatoms. They are fresh water diatoms, specifically common in lakes, and they are also common in fossil records, although their siliceous wall design may have been lost and they appear plane, an example is Eunotia tetradon.

References

 Eunotia at Algaebase

Diatom genera
Eunotiales
Taxa named by Christian Gottfried Ehrenberg